Walter Robert Johnson (September 27, 1927 – February 19, 1994) was a farmer, rancher and political figure in Saskatchewan, Canada. He represented Saltcoats from 1982 to 1991 in the Legislative Assembly of Saskatchewan as a Progressive Conservative.

He was born in Spy Hill, Saskatchewan in 1927, the son of Julius G. Johnson and Laura S. Thoradson. In 1952, Johnson married Dorothea Elaine Olson. Johnson was a livestock producer, a director of the Saskatchewan Hereford Association and a member of the Royal Canadian Legion. Johnson ran unsuccessfully for a seat in the provincial assembly in 1978 before being elected in 1982. He died in 1994 at the age of 66.

References 

Progressive Conservative Party of Saskatchewan MLAs
1927 births
1994 deaths